The 1984 Tour de France was the 71st edition of Tour de France, one of cycling's Grand Tours. The Tour began in Montreuil with a prologue individual time trial on 29 June and Stage 11 occurred on 9 July with a mountainous stage to Guzet-Neige. The race finished on the Champs-Élysées in Paris on 22 July.

Prologue
29 June 1984 — Montreuil to Noisy-le-Sec,  (individual time trial)

Stage 1
30 June 1984 — Bondy to Saint-Denis,

Stage 2
1 July 1984 — Bobigny to Louvroil,

Stage 3
2 July 1984 — Louvroil to Valenciennes,  (team time trial)

Stage 4
2 July 1984 — Valenciennes to Béthune,

Stage 5
3 July 1984 — Béthune to Cergy-Pontoise,

Stage 6
4 July 1984 — Cergy-Pontoise to Alençon,

Stage 7
5 July 1984 — Alençon to Le Mans,  (individual time trial)

Stage 8
6 July 1984 — Le Mans to Nantes,

Stage 9
7 July 1984 — Nantes to Bordeaux,

Stage 10
8 July 1984 — Langon to Pau,

Stage 11
9 July 1984 — Pau to Guzet-Neige,

References

1984 Tour de France
Tour de France stages